Gregory A. Poland is an American physician and vaccinologist. He is the Mary Lowell Leary professor of medicine at the Mayo Clinic in Rochester, Minnesota, as well as the director of the Mayo Clinic's Vaccine Research Group. He is also the editor-in-chief of the medical journal Vaccine.

Education
Poland received his BA in biology from Illinois Wesleyan University in 1977 where he was a member of Sigma Pi fraternity.  He received his MD from the Southern Illinois University School of Medicine in 1981.

Research and activism
Poland is known for researching the immunogenetics of responses to certain vaccines, including smallpox vaccines. He has also written about the negative impacts of the false claim that the MMR vaccine might cause autism, and is an outspoken advocate of mandatory influenza vaccination.

Department of Defense
In 2007, Poland was named by President George W. Bush to be president of the Health Defense Board.  This board answers to the Assistant Secretary of Defense for Health Affairs.  Dr. Poland has also been president of the Armed Forces Epidemiological Board and worked for over ten years as a consultant to the department.

Honors and awards
Poland received the Secretary of Defense Medal for Outstanding Public Service in 2004 and a Mastership in the American College of Physicians in 2008.

References

Vaccinologists
Living people
Illinois Wesleyan University alumni
Medical journal editors
Physicians from Illinois
Year of birth missing (living people)